Wilbur Ravel Kimball (January 28, 1863 – July 30, 1940) was an early aviator and pioneer of helicopter design. He was a member of the Aeronautic Society in New York City. He was also a member of the Early Birds of Aviation.

Biography
He was born on January 28, 1863, in Woburn, Massachusetts, to Maria and Wilbur F. Kimball. He married Elizabeth Norton Gurney of Brockton, Massachusetts. 

He died on July 30, 1940, at St. Luke's Hospital in Manhattan, age 77. He was buried in Woodbrook Cemetery in Woburn, Massachusetts.

References

Members of the Early Birds of Aviation
1863 births
1940 deaths